Miss America 2005, the 78th Miss America pageant, was held in Atlantic City on Saturday, September 18, 2004, following a week of events including the preliminary competition.

The pageant was broadcast live on ABC from Boardwalk Hall in Atlantic City. Although this was not known at the time, this pageant would be the last held in Atlantic City until 2013, as the pageant moved to Las Vegas, Nevada beginning in 2006. It was also the last one to be televised by an over-the-air network until 2011.

At the conclusion of the final night of competition, Ericka Dunlap crowned Deidre Downs of Alabama as her successor.

Selection of contestants
One delegate from each state was chosen in state pageants held in mid-2005. Prior to competing in state pageants, the majority of delegates first were required to win a local title. Each delegates title is pre-dated to 2005, for example Deidre Downs was "Miss Alabama 2004" rather than "Miss Alabama 2005".

Many contestants competed in state pageants in both the Miss America and Miss USA systems numerous times before winning titles, and some had previously in other states to those which they won their state title.

All contestants were required to be between the ages of 17-24, unmarried and a citizen of the United States. They were also required to meet residency and education requirements.

Competition
All delegates compete in an interview competition with the judges, based on their platform issue, and also in the swimsuit, evening gown and talent competitions.

Prior to the nationally televised competition, the delegates participate in three nights of preliminary competition (accounting for 30% of final night's score), where preliminary award winners are chosen in each category.

During the final telecast, following the announcement of the semi-finalists, the top ten competed in casual wear and swimsuit (each worth 15% and 10% of final night's score, respectively). The top five went on to compete in evening gown (15% of score) and took part in a quiz show (20% of score) that replaced the onstage question that year. The final two contestants (Miss Alabama 2004, Deidre Downs and Miss Louisiana 2004, Jennifer Dupont) standing advanced to the first-ever head-to-head talent competition (20% of score), the final event that determined who would become Miss America 2005.

Results

Placements

Order of announcements

Top 10

Top 5

Top 2

Awards

Preliminary awards

Final night awards

Quality of Life award

Non-finalist awards

Other awards

Delegates

Judges
Niki Taylor
Kellye Cash
Lawrence Hamilton
Jennifer Hanson
Phil Maloof
Barry Phillips
John Weidman

References

External links
 Miss America official website

2005
2005 beauty pageants
2005 in the United States
2004 in New Jersey
September 2004 events in the United States
Events in Atlantic City, New Jersey